Pedro Fernando Jaque Gatíca (born 1 October 1963) is a Chilean former professional footballer who played as a defender for clubs in Chile and Mexico.

Club career
Born in Lota, Chile, Jaque began his career with Lota Schwager in the second level of the Chilean football, getting promotion to the top division in the 1986 season. After a stint with Fernández Vial (1988–91), he moved to Cobreloa in 1992, with whom he won the 1992 Primera División.

Abroad, Jaque played for Mexican club Morelia in the 1994–95 season, where he coincided with his compatriots Marco Antonio Figueroa, Jaime Vera and Luis Pérez.

In his homeland, he also played for Deportes Concepción, Everton, Coquimbo Unido and Unión La Calera, his last club in 2003.

International career
Jaque made four appearances in friendly matches for the Chile national team from 1994 to 1995.

Post-retirement
Jaque has worked as a football agent, being the representative of players such as Juan Manuel Lucero and Jaime Riveros

In 2010, he served as technical manager of Deportes Temuco.

Honours
Cobreloa
 Chilean Primera División: 1992

References

External links
 
 Pedro Jaque at PartidosdeLaRoja.com 
 Pedro Jaque at SoloFutbol.cl 

1963 births
Living people
People from Lota, Chile
Chilean footballers
Chilean expatriate footballers
Chile international footballers
Lota Schwager footballers
C.D. Arturo Fernández Vial footballers
Cobreloa footballers
Atlético Morelia players
Deportes Concepción (Chile) footballers
Everton de Viña del Mar footballers
Coquimbo Unido footballers
Unión La Calera footballers
Primera B de Chile players
Chilean Primera División players
Liga MX players
Chilean expatriate sportspeople in Mexico
Expatriate footballers in Mexico
Association football defenders